Liverpool has a lengthy tradition of music both classical and pop. It is well known for the Beatles (who recorded 17 UK and 20 US number-one singles). Its pop and rock music scene has also been important in the development of a number of other bands and artists since the 1950s.

History 
In 2001 the Guinness Book of Records declared Liverpool "City of Pop" due to the many number one records to have emerged from the city.  The most famous band to have come from Liverpool is the Beatles who played many of their early gigs at the Cavern Club.

Many sea shanties specifically refer to Liverpool, such as "Heave Away", "Liverpool Judies", and "Maggie May", which was later performed by the Beatles.

In the 1960s, the city was home to the development of the Merseybeat style of pop music, popularised by artists including Gerry & The Pacemakers. However, even before Merseybeat Liverpool had successful acts such as Frankie Vaughan, Lita Roza and Billy Fury.  In the late 1970s/early 1980s, Echo & the Bunnymen, A Flock of Seagulls, Teardrop Explodes, the Mighty Wah!, OMD, China Crisis, Frankie Goes to Hollywood and Dead or Alive emerged. A punk rock and post-punk scene rose during this period, centred around the venue Eric's on Matthew Street, until its closure in 1980 lead way to newer acts and independent labels with "do-it-yourself" ethos. Record Collector Tim Peacock said regions of this movement were documented with five compilation albums: A Trip to the Dentist (1980) for Birkenhead; Jobs for the Boys (1985) and its sequel Son of Jobs for the Boys (1985) for Merseyside; Elegance, Charm & Deadly Danger (1985) for St Helens; and Ways to Wear Coats (1986) for Liverpool in general.

1990s bands that enjoyed success were the Boo Radleys, the La's, the Real People, the Farm and Cast. Peacock said the compilation album Dark Side of the Pool (1991) encapsulated the evolving indie music scene in Liverpool in the early 1990s. Since 2000 bands such as the Zutons, the Wombats and the Coral have become popular. As a backlash to this regular guitar pop music, another scene far more influenced by post punk and experimental music has emerged more recently, spearheaded by bands such as Space, Ladytron, Clinic, a.P.A.t.T., Hot Club de Paris and Kling Klang. Rappers such as Tremz, Aystar, Hazey and Still Brickin have also emerged, using strong Scouse accents.

In 2008 World Museum Liverpool (in partnership the Institute of Popular Music at University of Liverpool) created "The Beat Goes On" exhibition charting the history of music in Liverpool in depth, from 1945 to the present day.

Music events
The Liverpool International Music Festival (LIMF) evolved from the Mathew Street Music Festival, which was the largest annual free music festival in Liverpool attracting over 200,000 visitors to the city.

In 2011 the GIT Award - formed through influential Liverpool music blog Getintothis - was founded. Dubbed the 'Scouse Mercury Prize' by NME, the GIT Award celebrated and championed Merseyside's revitalised music scene. Garnering backing from over 90 businesses and with a judging panel including the Guardian, NME, 6 Music and founder Peter Guy from the Liverpool Echo, the GIT Award nominated 12 artists representing the best artists from that calendar year.

Liverpool hosts several music festivals each year which celebrate and represent the different cultures within the city. Africa Oye is the UK's largest free festival of African music.

Each year the Liverpool Irish Festival is held featuring mostly folk music celebrating the cultural links between Liverpool and Ireland. Liverpool contains a very large Irish population.

In 2017 the music event Melodic Distraction became a radio station in and serving Liverpool.

Venues
The 1960s saw the emergence of Merseybeat and the Cavern Club, the late 1970s and early 1980s a punk scene centred on another club, Eric's also on Mathew Street, while 1990s dance clubs included Quadrant Park, Cream and more recently Chibuku. The majority of the city's largest and most popular music venues and clubs are located at Concert Square, Mathew Street, Hardman Street and Hope Street, though the Baltic Triangle region of the city has seen a growth in popularity, with a number of venues appearing in previously disused warehouses. 
Current venues include the Echo Arena Liverpool, East Village Arts Club, Kazimier, Zanzibar, O2 Academy, The Magnet, Camp & Furnace and Leaf on Bold Street.

Recent notable bands

Record labels 
A number of independent record labels are currently active in the Liverpool scene:
Probe Plus Records
Apple Records
Jacaranda Records
The Viper Label
Deltasonic, now a division of Sony Music, is based in Liverpool and has released music by a number of Liverpool bands.
 3 Beat Records

Number-one singles
Below is a list of songs by artists from Liverpool that attained the number one position in the UK Singles Chart.

20th Century

1950s
 14 March 1953: Lita Roza - "(How Much Is) That Doggie in the Window?"
 25 January 1957: Frankie Vaughan - "The Garden of Eden"
 14 February 1958: Michael Holliday - "The Story of My Life"

1960s
1960
 29 January: Michael Holliday - "Starry Eyed"
1961
 7 December: Frankie Vaughan - "Tower of Strength"
1963
 11 April: Gerry and the Pacemakers - "How Do You Do It?"
 2 May: The Beatles - "From Me to You"
 20 June: Gerry and the Pacemakers - "I Like It"
 8 August: The Searchers - "Sweets for My Sweet"
 22 August: Billy J. Kramer and The Dakotas - "Bad to Me"
 12 September: The Beatles - "She Loves You"
 31 October: Gerry and the Pacemakers - "You'll Never Walk Alone"
 28 November: The Beatles - "She Loves You"
 12 December: The Beatles - "I Want to Hold Your Hand"
1964
 30 January: The Searchers - "Needles and Pins"
 27 February: Cilla Black - "Anyone Who Had a Heart"
 19 March: Billy J. Kramer and The Dakotas - "Little Children"
 2 April: The Beatles - "Can't Buy Me Love"
 7 May: The Searchers - "Don't Throw Your Love Away"
 28 May: Cilla Black - "You're My World"
 23 July: The Beatles - "A Hard Day's Night"
 10 December: The Beatles - "I Feel Fine"
1965
 22 April: The Beatles - "Ticket to Ride"
 5 August: The Beatles - "Help!"
 30 September: Ken Dodd - "Tears"
 16 December: The Beatles - "Day Tripper"/"We Can Work It Out"
1966
 23 June: The Beatles  - "Paperback Writer"
 18 August: The Beatles - "Yellow Submarine"/"Eleanor Rigby"
1967
 19 July: The Beatles - "All You Need Is Love"
 6 December: The Beatles - "Hello, Goodbye"
1968
 27 March: The Beatles - "Lady Madonna"
 11 September: The Beatles - "Hey Jude"
 11 December: The Scaffold - "Lily the Pink"
1969
 8 January: The Scaffold - "Lily the Pink" (second peak at #1)
 23 April: The Beatles with Billy Preston - "Get Back"
 11 June: The Beatles - "The Ballad of John and Yoko"

1970s
1971
 30 January: George Harrison - "My Sweet Lord"

1976
 26 June: The Real Thing - "You to Me Are Everything"

1977
 3 December: Wings - "Mull of Kintyre/Girls' School"

1980s
1980
 20 December: John Lennon - "(Just Like) Starting Over"
1981
 10 January: John Lennon - "Imagine"
 7 February: John Lennon - "Woman"
1982
 24 April: Paul McCartney with Stevie Wonder - "Ebony and Ivory"
1984
 14 January: Paul McCartney - "Pipes of Peace"
 28 January: Frankie Goes to Hollywood - "Relax"
 16 June: Frankie Goes to Hollywood - "Two Tribes"
 8 December: Frankie Goes to Hollywood - "The Power of Love"
1985
 9 March: Dead or Alive - "You Spin Me Round (Like a Record)"
 15 June: The Crowd - "You'll Never Walk Alone"
1987
 4 April: Ferry Aid - "Let it Be"
1989
 20 May: Various artists - "Ferry Cross the Mersey"
 22 July: Sonia - "You'll Never Stop Me Loving You"

1990s
1996
 26 May: Baddiel, Skinner & The Lightning Seeds - "Three Lions"
1998
 14 June: Baddiel, Skinner & The Lightning Seeds : "Three Lions '98"

21st Century

2000s
2000
 March 26: Melanie C featuring Lisa "Left Eye" Lopes - "Never Be the Same Again"
 August 13: Melanie C - "I Turn to You"
2001
 February 4: Atomic Kitten - "Whole Again"
 July 29: Atomic Kitten - "Eternal Flame"
2002
 January 20: George Harrison - "My Sweet Lord"
 April 28: Sugababes - "Freak Like Me"
 August 18: Sugababes - "Round Round"
 September 1: Atomic Kitten - "The Tide Is High (Get the Feeling)"
2003
 October 19: Sugababes - "Hole in the Head"
2007
 September 30: Sugababes - "About You Now"

2010s
2012
 Christmas number one : The Justice Collective - "He Ain't Heavy, He's My Brother"

See also 
Royal Liverpool Philharmonic

References

External links

Spotlight On Erics exhibition
The Beatles Online exhibition

Music scenes